William Neil Tompkins (15 January 1927 – 20 February 1991) was an Australian rules footballer who played with Geelong in the Victorian Football League (VFL).

Tompkins was a member of Royal Australian Navy and played his early football at North Geelong. He made all of his 12 appearances for Geelong in the 1945 VFL season. Geelong cleared him to Carlton in 1950 but he didn't play any league football at his new club. He was inducted into the North Geelong Football Club's Hall of Fame in 2014.

References

External links

1927 births
Australian rules footballers from Victoria (Australia)
Geelong Football Club players
North Geelong Football Club players
Royal Australian Navy personnel of World War II
1991 deaths